Ajay Pohankar (born 24 February 1947) is an Indian classical vocalist belonging to Kirana Gharana school of Hindustani classical music.

Background and career
Ajay Pohankar was born in Jabalpur, Madhya Pradesh in a Deshastha Brahmin Marathi family, where his father was a lawyer. His first Guru was his mother Sushilabai Pohankar, a classical vocalist and a musicologist of Kirana gharana. At a young age of 11, Pohankar was invited to perform at the annual Sawai Gandharva Music Festival in Pune His sister, Swati Natekar, is also a singer based in London.

Ajay Pohankar is married to Anjali, a vocalist and musicologist who has also written a book on Thumri. They have a son, Abhijit Pohankar, a keyboard player of Indian classical music and a fusion music composer and producer.

Awards and honours
In 2009, Pohankar was awarded the Tansen Samman  by the Government of Madhya Pradesh In 2012, he was awarded the Sangeet Natak Akademi Award, the highest award for performing artists, conferred by the Sangeet Natak Akademi, India's National Academy for Music, Dance and Drama.

References

External links
 Official site

1948 births
Hindustani singers
Living people
People from Jabalpur
20th-century Indian male classical singers
Recipients of the Sangeet Natak Akademi Award